High Speed 2 is a planned new high-speed railway line connecting London with the city centres of Birmingham, Manchester and Leeds directly on new high speed track.  East Midlands Airport will also be served. The railway is to be delivered in two phases:

 Phase 1: linking London and Birmingham.
 Phase 2: linking Birmingham with Manchester and Leeds. 

Phase 2 is planned for completion in 2032–33. Phase two is split into two sub-phases:
 Phase 2a: the section from Birmingham to Crewe, which is to be built simultaneously with phase 1, effectively merging  with phase 1.
 Phase 2b: the remainder of phase 2.

The concept of HS2 was that all major cities covered would have a city centre HS2 station. Liverpool, along with London, Birmingham, Manchester and Leeds, was envisaged to have a city centre HS2 station. The scheme was cut down to only three provincial city centres served directly by HS2, two being on phase 2. The preliminary route for Phase Two was announced on 28 January 2013. It is envisaged construction on Phase Two will start in 2022 with completion by 2032.

Birmingham to Manchester (phases 2a & 2b)

Birmingham to Crewe (phase 2a)

Birmingham to Crewe is phase 2a, which is proposed to be built before phase 2b, simultaneously with phase 1. HS2 will pass through Staffordshire and Cheshire, in a tunnel under Crewe station but not stopping at Crewe railway station. However, the HS2 line will be linked to the West Coast Main Line via a grade-separated junction just south of Crewe, enabling  "classic compatible" trains exiting the high-speed line to call at the existing Crewe station.

High-speed Crewe hub (phase 2a)
In 2014 David Higgins, who was then chairman of High Speed Two (HS2) Limited, proposed an addition to phase two: a high-speed hub at Crewe to take advantage of, and have access to, the six classic lines radiating from the existing Crewe junction. Many more regions and cities would have overall superior journey times being accessed with a combination of HS2 and classic lines. The hub is a part of phase two, but Higgins proposed the hub and line from Birmingham to Crewe (phase 2a) should be constructed simultaneously with phase one.

Crewe is a major rail junction with six radiating classic lines from the junction to Scotland/Liverpool, Birmingham/London, Chester, Shrewsbury, Stoke and Manchester. The high-speed hub is to be sited to the south of the current Crewe station. The intention is for high-speed trains to run off the northbound HS2 line into the high-speed hub and out onto a number of classic lines without passing through the bottleneck of the existing Crewe station, keeping line speeds as fast as possible. A new high-speed rail station is proposed as a part of the hub.

On 17 July 2017, this was approved by the government.

Manchester Airport (phase 2b)

A station is planned to serve Manchester Airport on the southern boundary of Manchester. The two stations are not connected. An airport station was recommended by local authorities during the consultation stage. The government agreed in January 2013 for an airport station but agreed only on the basis that private investment was involved, such as funding from the Manchester Airports Group to build the station. The average journey from London Euston to Manchester Airport would be 59 minutes.

Manchester city centre (phase 2b)

The route will continue from the airport into Manchester city centre via a  bored tunnel under the dense urban districts of south Manchester before surfacing at Ardwick. The tunnel will be the longest rail tunnel to be built in the United Kingdom, surpassing the  High Speed 1 tunnel completed in 2004. It is anticipated that the stretch from Rostherne in Cheshire to Ardwick will take up to 7 years to construct.

The 7.6 mile twin-bore tunnel will be at an average depth of 33 metres and trains will travel at  through the tunnel. The diameter size of the tunnel is dependent on the train speed and length of the tunnel. It is envisaged both tunnels will be, as an 'absolute minimum', at least 7.25 metres in diameter to accommodate the high speed trains.

Up to fifteen sites were put forward including Sportcity, Pomona Island, expanding Deansgate railway station and re-configuring the disused grade-II listed Manchester Central terminal station building back into a station. Three final sites made the long list: Manchester Piccadilly station, Salford Central station and a newly built station at Salford Middlewood Locks. Three approaches were considered, one via the M62, one via the River Mersey and the other through south Manchester. Both Manchester and Salford City Council recommended routing High Speed 2 to Manchester Piccadilly to maximise economic potential and connectivity rather than building a new station at a greater cost and which could be isolated from existing transport links.

HS2 trains will terminate at an upgraded Manchester Piccadilly station. At least four new  platforms will be built to accommodate the new high-speed trains in addition to the two platforms which are currently planned as part of the Northern Hub proposal. It is envisaged Platform 1 under the existing listed train shed will also be converted to a fifth HS2 platform to reduce cost. However at 242 metres long, it is the shortest platform at the station and falls short of the 400 metre platform required to accommodate High Speed trains. The HS2 concourse will be connected to the existing concourse at Piccadilly. HS2 will reduce the average journey time from central Manchester to central London from 2 hours 8 minutes to 1 hour 8 minutes.

Current status

Following the conclusion of the Oakervee Review, the government decided to proceed with legislation for the Western Leg of Phase 2b as a priority. As such, HS2 Ltd said in June 2021 that they intend to submit a hybrid bill before Parliament for the Western Leg in early 2022, or sooner if possible.

Birmingham to Leeds (phase 2b)
A new station in the East Midlands is proposed, which may be a parkway station, to serve Nottingham, Derby and Leicester. The Derbyshire and Nottingham Chamber supported high-speed rail going to the East Midlands but was concerned that a parkway station instead of centrally located city stations would result in no overall net benefit in journey times to existing services. East Midlands Parkway railway station was recently constructed on the Midland Main Line south of Derby and Nottingham. HS2 would continue north to a station at Sheffield railway station in South Yorkshire (serving Sheffield and surrounding large towns), terminating in West Yorkshire at Leeds railway station.

Toton Sidings (phase 2b)

Chesterfield (phase 2b)

Sheffield Midland (phase 2b)

Leeds (phase 2b)

HS2 will reduce the average journey time from central Leeds to London from 2 hours 20 minutes to 1 hour 28 minutes.

Current status

The government made clear in its response to the Oakervee Review its commitment to Phase 2b of HS2. As part of this, the government plans to present an Integrated Rail Plan for the North and Midlands by the end of 2020, informed by an assessment from the National Infrastructure Commission, which will look at how to deliver the Eastern Leg of Phase 2b, Northern Powerhouse Rail, East Midlands Hub and other rail programmes better and more effectively. As such, work on the Eastern Leg of Phase 2b has been paused.

The new platforms at Leeds would be retained but the planned East Midlands Hub station would not be built.

Integrated Rail Plan (IRP)
On the 18 November 2021, the UK government published the Integrated Rail Plan for the North and Midlands which substantially affected the eastern portion of HS Phase Two.

References

Notes

High Speed 2
Proposed railway lines in England